The Calgary Roughnecks are a lacrosse team based in Calgary playing in the National Lacrosse League (NLL). The 2013 season was the 12th in franchise history. 

For the third straight season, the Roughnecks finished the season first in the west, but ran into trouble in the playoffs. Calgary defeated the Colorado Mammoth 15-10 in the division semi-finals but in a thrilling division final game, the Washington Stealth held on to win 14-13 and end the Roughnecks season.

Regular season

Conference standings

Game log
Reference:

Playoffs

Game log

Roster

Transactions

Trades

Entry Draft
The 2012 NLL Entry Draft took place on October 1, 2012. The Roughnecks made the following selections:

See also
2013 NLL season

References

Calgary
Calgary Roughnecks seasons